Kënga Magjike is an annual music competition organised by the Albanian television broadcaster Televizioni Klan. The music competition has been broadcasting annually since its inauguration in 1999 with the exception of 2020. 

The first edition of the contest was broadcast live by Radio Televizioni Shqiptar while all the editions from 2003 by Televizioni Klan. Ardit Gjebrea has been the main presenter of the contest since the first edition and in other occasions he has hosted with other co-presenters amongst them Brigitte Nielsen, Natalia Estrada, Songül Öden and Elia Zogu.

History

1999–2005 

Throughout its history, different broadcasters have been credited with the production and airing of this event, including RTSH, Klan TV, TVA, RTV NRG (Albania) and RTV21, RTK (Kosovo), as well as many radio stations. It is currently produced and aired by Klan TV.

Kënga Magjike was created by singer, composer, host and organizer Ardit Gjebrea and began airing in 1999. It usually airs each November, with a few exceptions. It was originally aired as a three or four night event similar to Festivali i Këngës; however, in 2005 a new format of presenting the songs was introduced. Each song was broadcast one month prior to the semi-finals and the final in a special edition called "Duke Pritur Kënga Magjike..." (Awaiting Kënga Magjike...), giving the viewers a chance to vote for the songs that would pass on to the semi-finals through phone, text or online in the festival's official website. A jury was also used when determining which songs made it to the next stage.

2006–present 

This format was later replaced by the current system, where groups of songs are presented weekly in the E Diela Shqiptare (The Albanian Sunday) show on Klan TV hosted by Ardit Gjebrea. Established singers automatically pass to the semi-finals stage, while newcomers must rely on the verdict of a professional jury. Once the semi-finalists are determined and their acts are performed in the semis, it is the singers themselves who must vote for each other in a 1-through-30 (skipping 23, 25, 27, 28 and 29) point system to determine both the songs that will reach the finals and their final ranking. The professional jury, the organizers of the festival and the TV station are tasked with determining the titles of the prizes that each finalist will be awarded.

Following criticism for the use of playback in the delivery of songs, the organizers decided to limit the use of playback to just the weekly presentation stage in 2015. Established singers are allowed to use playback in this phase, while newcomers must sing live in order to receive a verdict by the jury. Nonetheless, the semi-finals and the final must all be delivered live by both established and debuting singers.

The festival has been praised for the diversity of music it has brought to the public, providing a great mixture of singers and bands from Albania with those from neighboring countries, a large portion coming from Kosovo, North Macedonia, Montenegro and other areas. Kënga Magjike has also been the stage for many comebacks of famous Albanian singers that reside in other countries, as well as artists which have contributed to the Albanian music industry in the past. Songs from this contest have resulted in numerous memorable hits for Albanians throughout the world. Compared to its main competitors, Kënga Magjike features more bubble-gum and commercialized music, contrasting with the predominantly alternative and rock genres featured in Top Awards on Top Channel, while not being as exclusively prohibitive as Festivali i Këngës, which typically admits only professional vocalists.

Presenter Ardit Gjebrea announced that during 2020, Kënga Magjike will not be done and will return in 2021.

Winners 

As the second longest-running music competition in Albania, twenty songs have won the Kënga Magjike which has been broadcast every year since its debut in 1999. The festival's winner has been determined using numerous voting techniques throughout its history while centre to these have been the awarding of points to the participants by juries, televoters or the participants themselves.

See also 
 Festivali i Këngës

References

External links 

Official website 
Kënga Magjike on Televizioni Klan (TV Klan) 

 
Music festivals established in 1999
Contemporary music festivals in Albania
Singing competitions